Rain is an unincorporated community located in Whitley County, Kentucky, United States.

The origin of the name "Rain" is obscure.

References

Unincorporated communities in Whitley County, Kentucky
Unincorporated communities in Kentucky